Antidiotico is a greatest hits album by Orishas, a Cuban hip hop group based in France. It was released in 2007.

Track listing
Disc 1
"Hay un Son" - 3:09
"A lo Cubano" - 4:04
"Elegante" - 3:58
"Emigrantes" - 3:35
"537 C.U.B.A." - 4:23
"Represent, Cuba" featuring Heather Headley - 3:43
"Naci Orishas" - 4:53
"¿Qué pasa?" - 3:42
"Silencio" - 4:19
"Connexion" - 4:13
"Habana" - 4:38
"El Kilo" - 4:25
"¿Qué Bola?" - 4:21
"¿Quién Te Dijo?" featuring Pitbull - 4:08
"Una Página Doblada" - 3:47

Disc 2
"Mistica"
"Desaparecidos"
"Bombo"
"Soy Guajiro" featuring Benny Moré
"Guadalupe Cuba" featuring Kayliah
"Sigue Sigue" featuring Da Weasel
"La Alianza" featuring Carlos Jean
"1999" (Malou Remix)
"Orishas Llego" (Cayo Hueso Remix)
"¿Que Pasa?" (Red Remix)

DVD (Music Videos)
"A Lo Cubano"
"537 C.U.B.A."
"Represent"
"¿Que Pasa?"
"Mujer"
"Habana"
"Naci Orishas"
"El Kilo"

Orishas (band) albums
2007 compilation albums